Dudleyville is an unincorporated community in Bond County, Illinois, United States. Dudleyville is south of Greenville and near Greenville Airport.

History
A post office was established at Dudleyville in 1861, and remained in operation until 1902. The community was named for John Dudley, the original owner of the town site.

References

Unincorporated communities in Bond County, Illinois
Unincorporated communities in Illinois
1861 establishments in Illinois